Gastre Department is a  department of Chubut Province in Argentina.

The provincial subdivision has a population of about 1,508 inhabitants in an area of 16,335 km², and its capital city is Gastre, which is located around 1,713 km from the Capital federal.

Settlements
 Gastre
 Lagunita Salada
 Blancuntre
 El Escorial
 Yala Laubat
 Campamento Los Adobes
 Quechu-Niyeo
 Taquetren
 Colelache
 Sacanana
 Bajada Moreno

External links
Gastre website 
Federal website 

Populated places established in 1904
Departments of Chubut Province